Carol A. Siwek (born 1938) is an American politician from New York.

Life
She was born in 1938. She entered politics as a Republican.

In November 1980, she was elected in the 142nd District to the New York State Assembly, unseating the 22-year-incumbent Democrat Stephen R. Greco. She sat in the 184th New York State Legislature in 1981 and 1982. At the re-apportionment in 1982, the area of her residence was joined with parts of the old 144th District to form the new 144th District. In November 1982, she ran for re-election, but was defeated by Democrat William B. Hoyt, the incumbent of the old 144th District.

In September 1985, Carol Siwek ran in the Republican primary for Mayor of Buffalo, but was defeated by the incumbent Mayor James D. Griffin, a registered Democrat. Griffin lost the Democratic primary, and was re-elected on the Republican, Conservative and Right to Life tickets.

Her daughter Donna M. Siwek (born 1961) took office as a Justice of the New York Supreme Court in January 2001.

References

1938 births
Living people
Politicians from Buffalo, New York
Republican Party members of the New York State Assembly
Women state legislators in New York (state)
21st-century American women